Canalisporium is a fungus genus of uncertain placement in the Sordariomycetes. It was placed in order of Savoryellales in 2020.

There were 14 species or binomial combinations, according to MycoBank in 2015.

Species 
As accepted by Species Fungorum (in 2020);

 Canalisporium aquaticium 
 Canalisporium caribense  
 Canalisporium dehongense 
 Canalisporium elegans 
 Canalisporium exiguum  
 
 
 Canalisporium grenadoidium  
 Canalisporium jinghongense 
 Canalisporium kenyense 
 Canalisporium koshabeejae 
 Canalisporium krabiense 
 Canalisporium macrosporum 

 Canalisporium nanhuaense 
 Canalisporium nigrum  
 Canalisporium pallidum  
 Canalisporium panamense  
 Canalisporium parvum 
 Canalisporium paulopallidum 
 
 Canalisporium taiwanense 
 Canalisporium thailandense 
 Canalisporium variabile  
 Canalisporium waffleum 

Former species;
 C. microsporum  = Trimmatostroma canalisporioides, Mollisiaceae
 C. pulchrum  = Berkleasmium pulchrum, Pleosporales

References

External links
 

Sordariomycetes genera
Sordariomycetes enigmatic taxa